Luguentz Dort (born April 19, 1999;  or ) is a Canadian professional basketball player for the Oklahoma City Thunder  of the National Basketball Association (NBA). He played college basketball for the Arizona State Sun Devils.

Dort completed his high school career at the Athlete Institute in Mono, Ontario, where he was rated as high as a five-star recruit and was one of the top high school players in Canada. In his first year with Arizona State, he earned second-team All-Pac-12 Conference honors and was named to the all-defensive team in the Pac-12. He was also voted the conference’s freshman of the year.

Early life
Dort was born in Montreal, Quebec to Haitian parents who moved to Canada from Saint-Marc when they were around 21 years old. Growing up in Montréal-Nord, he first played soccer as a goalkeeper, but his brothers later influenced him to play basketball. Dort played street basketball at Saint Laurent Park near his home in Montreal. His involvement in the sport helped him avoid joining street gangs like some of his friends. At age 12, Dort began playing organized basketball in Park Extension, a neighborhood in Montreal, where he was coached by Nelson Ossé. He started weight training at age 15. He would continue to grow about one inch per year through the rest of his teenage years.

High school career
Dort spent his freshman season at the high school level in Quebec. Through his high school years, he competed for Brookwood Elite on the Amateur Athletic Union (AAU) circuit. In July 2015, he played for Canada at the adidas Nations tournament, averaging 9.2 points and 4 rebounds through 4 games. As a sophomore, Dort transferred to Arlington Country Day School in Jacksonville, Florida to face better competition and learn English. Before moving, his coach Nelson Ossé urged him to improve his poor academic performance. In August 2016, Dort averaged 11.3 points through 6 games to lead Canada to second place at adidas Nations. Later in the month, he was invited to the Nike Americas Team Camp, where he was named most valuable player (MVP) of the All-Star game. Dort moved to Conrad Academy in Orlando, Florida for his junior season, following his former Arlington Country Day coach Shaun Wiseman. In 2017, he took part in adidas Nations and the Nike Hoop Summit All-Star game. Dort also scored 30 points to win team MVP honors at the BioSteel All-Canadian Basketball Game. On October 18, 2017, he committed to play college basketball for Arizona State, becoming the program's most touted recruit since James Harden in 2007. As a senior, Dort joined the Athlete Institute, a prep school in Mono, Ontario. In April 2018, he reclaimed team MVP accolades at the BioSteel All-Canadian Game after recording 34 points and 8 rebounds.

College career

On November 6, 2018, Dort made his debut for Arizona State, tallying 28 points, 9 rebounds, and 3 steals in a 102–94 win over Cal State Fullerton in double-overtime. He broke the school record for freshman debut points. Dort, on November 12, recorded his first double-double, with 12 points and 12 rebounds in a 90–58 win over Long Beach State. On November 21, he posted 33 points, 7 rebounds, and 4 assists against Utah State in the heavyweight bracket of the MGM Resorts Main Event, scoring the third-most points by a freshman in Arizona State history. He was named MVP of the tournament. A few days later, Dort was named Pac-12 Conference Player of the Week. He struggled offensively towards the end of December, shooting a combined 9-of-45 from the field through four games from December 15 to 29. 

Following Arizona State's loss in the 2019 NCAA men's basketball tournament, Dort announced his intention to forgo his final three seasons of collegiate eligibility and declare for the 2019 NBA draft.

Professional career

Oklahoma City Thunder (2019–present)
After going undrafted in the 2019 NBA draft, Dort signed a two-way contract with the Oklahoma City Thunder. He made his NBA debut on December 6, 2019, playing 7 minutes and grabbing one rebound in an overtime win against the Minnesota Timberwolves. On January 29, 2020, Dort scored a then career-high 23 points with two rebounds, a steal and a block in a 120–100 win over the Sacramento Kings. In the 2020 NBA playoffs, Dort was lauded for his defense on James Harden during a seven game round one loss and for, by at least one measure, being "the highest-effort defensive player in the NBA."

On June 24, 2020, the Thunder announced that they had re-signed Dort to a 4-year, $5.4 million contract. On April 13, 2021, Dort scored a career-high 42 points in a 106–96 loss to the Utah Jazz, making seven 3-pointers in the process, also a career-high.

On February 2, 2022, Dort scored a season-high 30 points, including 14 straight for the Thunder to end the game, in a 120–114 overtime win against the Dallas Mavericks. On March 8, he underwent season-ending surgery to address a labrum tear in his left shoulder.

On July 6, 2022, after he had his team option declined, Dort re-signed with the Thunder on a five-year, $87.5 million contract.

National team career
On May 24, 2022, Dort agreed to a three-year commitment to play with the Canadian senior men's national team.

Career statistics

NBA

Regular season

|-
| style="text-align:left;"| 
| style="text-align:left;"| Oklahoma City
| 36 || 28 || 22.8 || .394 || .297 || .792 || 2.3 || .8 || .9 || .1 || 6.8
|-
| style="text-align:left;"| 
| style="text-align:left;"| Oklahoma City
| 52 || 52 || 29.7 || .387 || .343 || .744 || 3.6 || 1.7 || .9 || .4 || 14.0
|-
| style="text-align:left;"| 
| style="text-align:left;"| Oklahoma City
| 51 || 51 || 32.6 || .404 || .332 || .843 || 4.2 || 1.7 || .9 || .4 || 17.2 
|- class="sortbottom"
| style="text-align:center;" colspan="2"| Career
| 139 || 131 || 29.0 || .395 || .333 || .797 || 3.5 || 1.5 || .9 || .3 || 13.3

Playoffs

|-
| align="left"| 2020
| align="left"|Oklahoma City
| 6 || 6 || 29.2 || .355 || .260 || .533 || 3.7 || 1.0 || .3 || 1.0 || 12.5
|- class="sortbottom"
| align="center" colspan="2"| Career
| 6 || 6 || 29.2 || .355 || .260 || .533 || 3.7 || 1.0 || .3 || 1.0 || 12.5

College

|-
| style="text-align:left;"| 2018–19
| style="text-align:left;"| Arizona State
| 34 || 33 || 31.5 || .405 || .307 || .700 || 4.3 || 2.3 || 1.5 || .2 || 16.1
|-

References

External links

Arizona State Sun Devils bio

1999 births
Living people
Arizona State Sun Devils men's basketball players
Basketball players from Montreal
Canadian expatriate basketball people in the United States
Canadian men's basketball players
Canadian sportspeople of Haitian descent
Haitian Quebecers
National Basketball Association players from Canada
Oklahoma City Blue players
Oklahoma City Thunder players
Shooting guards
Small forwards
Undrafted National Basketball Association players